Kaugatoma Bay is bay in Saare County, Estonia.

Eastern-southern part of the bay is called as Ariste Bay and southern part as Lõu or Lõo Bay.

Several islets are located on the bay, e.g. Ooslamaa, Paasrahu, Võrkrahu.

References

Bays of Estonia
Saare County